Schmitz Park, also known as Schmitz Preserve Park, is a  park around 15 blocks east of Alki Point in West Seattle, Washington. It features Schmitz Park Creek and one of the last stands of old-growth forest in the city.

Ferdinand and Emma Schmitz donated  of the park to the city in 1908. They wanted their land to be used  as a park. (Ferdinand was a German immigrant who moved to Seattle in 1887 and was the city's Parks Commissioner from 1908 to 1914). Additions to the park were purchased in 1909, 1930, 1947, and 1958, making the park grow over 20 more acres (8 ha). 

In 1949, a "preservation policy" was applied to Schmitz Park. It stated that only foot trails were allowed and all signs were to be removed from inside the park's borders. This policy still remains today.

In 1953, Schmitz Park Elementary School opened to the public.  The school sits adjacent to Schmitz Park.

In January 2018 Seattle City Council Bill No. CB 119169 authorized the purchase of a 5,000-sq. ft. lot at the southeast edge of the park from Bruce Stotler for $225,000, less than half its assessed value.

External links

Parks Department page on Schmitz Park

Parks in Seattle
West Seattle, Seattle